Mimoides microdamas is a Neotropical butterfly in the family Papilionidae. It is found in southern Brazil, Argentina and Paraguay.

Description
A yellowish band from the costal margin of the forewing to the anal angle of the hindwing; under surface without red basal spots on the forewing, with four spots on the hindwing. Female similar to the male.

Biology
A lowland species.

References

Lewis, H.L. (1974). Butterflies of the World  Page 23, figure 22

Butterflies described in 1878
Mimoides
Papilionidae of South America
Taxa named by Hermann Burmeister